Matúškovo (formerly Takšoň; , until 1899 ) is a village and municipality in Galanta District of  the Trnava Region of south-west Slovakia.

Geography
The municipality lies at an elevation of 118 metres and covers an area of 11.954 km². It has a population of about 1938 people.

History
In the 9th century, the territory of Matúškovo became part of the Kingdom of Hungary. In historical records the village was first mentioned in 1138. After the Austro-Hungarian army disintegrated in November 1918, Czechoslovak troops occupied the area, later acknowledged internationally by the Treaty of Trianon. Between 1938 and 1945 Matúškovo once more  became part of Miklós Horthy's Hungary through the First Vienna Award. From 1945 until the Velvet Divorce, it was part of Czechoslovakia. Since then it has been part of Slovakia.

References

External links
https://web.archive.org/web/20080111223415/http://www.statistics.sk/mosmis/eng/run.html

Villages and municipalities in Galanta District
Hungarian communities in Slovakia